Bembo is a town and commune of Angola, located in the province of Malanje.

See also 

 Communes of Angola

References 

Populated places in Malanje Province